The Return of the Wayfaring Stranger (Columbia Records C-186) is a 78-rpm set consisting of four 10-inch discs. Released in 1949, the album was concurrently presented as a 10-inch LP, assigned the catalog number CL-6058. On February 28, 1955, Columbia expanded to 12 inches The Wayfaring Stranger (monaural catalog number: CL 628; 1964 simulated-stereo catalog number: CS 9041), a Burl Ives album dating back to 1941, originally containing twelve tunes and initially called Okeh Presents the Wayfaring Stranger. Included in the 1955 collection were all nine songs from The Return of the Wayfaring Stranger. In August 1960, Columbia, using a slightly shortened title, Return of the Wayfaring Stranger, released a 12-inch LP of 13 different selections recorded by Burl Ives between 1949 and 1951. The 12-inch versions of The Wayfaring Stranger and Return of the Wayfaring Stranger were transferred to CD format by Collectables Records on November 14, 2000. Each disc contains bonus tracks. Currently, both CDs are in print.

Track listing

References

1949 albums
Burl Ives albums
Columbia Records albums